Shangyu District is a district of the prefecture-level city of Shaoxing in the northeast of Zhejiang province, China.  At the 2010 census, its population in the built-up (or metro) area was 779,412, up from 722,523 in the 2000 census. Shangyu is roughly fifty kilometers from north to south and about thirty kilometers from east to west. It makes up about one-fourth of the area of Shaoxing prefecture. Shangyu District is not part of the Hangzhou-Shaoxing built-up area as some countryside still prevent the city from being conurbated until now.

Administrative divisions
Subdistricts:
Baiguan Subdistrict (百官街道), Cao'e Subdistrict (曹娥街道), Dongguan Subdistrict (东关街道)

Towns:
Daoxu (道墟镇), Shangpu (上浦镇), Tangpu (汤浦镇), Zhangzhen (章镇镇), Xiaguan (下管镇), Fenghui (丰惠镇), Yonghe (永和镇), Lianghu (梁湖镇), Yiting (驿亭镇), Songxia (崧厦镇), Lihai (沥海镇), Xiaoyue (小越镇), Xietang (谢塘镇), Changtang (长塘镇), Gaibei (盖北镇)

Townships:
Lingnan Township (岭南乡), Chenxi Township (陈溪乡), Dingzhai Township (丁宅乡)

Climate

Baiguan
Shangyu's urban center, Baiguan, is located where the Cao'e River flows out of the hilly area that makes up more than half of the county, into flat alluvial land bordering Hangzhou Bay. This river, and the Cao E Temple next to it, are named after a fourteen-year-old girl who became famous in 143 AD for her filial devotion.  She died in the river trying to retrieve the body of her father (Cao Xu) who drowned while officiating at a ceremony in honor of Wu Zixu who himself was famous for his filial piety.

The railroad from Hangzhou to Ningbo passes through Baiguan, and the new superhighway between Hangzhou and Ningbo skirts Baiguan. Within Shangyu, just northwest of Baiguan, the Hangzhou-Ningbo highway (mostly east-west) intersects with a superhighway that goes south to the seacoast and then down the coast, through Wenzhou and Fuzhou, all the way to Guangzhou.

In the name "Baiguan" “bai” means “hundred” and “guan” means an imperial civil service official. The city came to be called this when it became famous for producing many scholars who became officials by passing the imperial civil service examination.

Culture
In the tragic legend of the Butterfly Lovers, the young lady was from Shangyu and the young gentleman was from Shaoxing.

Two books by Zhang Jinhuan published by the Zhejiang University Press deal with porcelain (mostly celadon) produced in the Cao'e River Valley in Shangyu starting in the Eastern Han dynasty:
Shangyu Yue Kilns  (2007) , and
Yue Porcelain Gems (2009) .

Language

Wu language, also known as Jiang Nan, Wu Yue, Jiang Dong language. Three thousand years of history from the Zhou Dynasty. In China, Wu language are distributing in Zhejiang, southern part of Jiangsu, Shanghai, southern part of Anhui and Fujian province. The population who use this language is about ninety million.

People in Shangyu are use Wu language as major communication way in daily life. This language retains many ancient tones and words, culture value of research Chinese development is very high. It is a vivid expression of the thinking way and life style of the people who live in the south of the Yangtze River. More than one hundred cities led by Shanghai, make up Wu city group and Jiangnan culture circle that have similar value recognition, creating huge treasure through unity and mutual aid. Yangtze river delta region became the richest area in the whole China, Shangyu district is one of important part in it.

Putonghua (Standard mandarin) is the general language of China, it takes Beijing pronunciation as the standard pronunciation, northern dialect as the basic dialect. Shangyu is located in the south of China, so these two languages are very different, but to enhance communication among all ethnic groups and promote the cohesion of the Chinese nation, the government started popularizing Putonghua on a national scale from 2005.  Therefore, people in Shangyu using Wu language as daily communication and using Putonghua in schools or travel to other places.

Traditional food 
Steamed pork with preserved vegetables

Cook pork firstly with star anise and soy sauce, then cover the pork with the pickled vegetables, finally steamed together in the specific pot. It tastes delicious but not greasy due to heavy fat, smooth and chewy. For the nutrition value, Pork have high quality protein and essential fatty acid, preserved vegetables have high concentration carotene and magnesium.

Fermented bean curd

 
It is a traditional folk food that has been spread for thousands of years in China. Because of its good taste, high nutrition and specific smell, the special flavor of eating is loved by the Chinese people. Fermented bean curd can be divides to three categories that are red, white and green. "Red hot", "Rose" and "Sweet spicy" are characteristics of fermented bean curd, which are only produced in Shangyu district. Bean curd make from beans and yellow wine. Because of its good taste, high nutrition and specific smell, the special flavor of eating is loved by the Chinese people. Fermented bean curd can be divides to three categories that are red, white and green.

It cover the culture and memory of Shangyu people from childhood. It is the best food for breakfast.

As for the cook methods, every family have different ways to do it depend on taste and mom's requirements

Yellow rice wine
 
Yellow rice wine used rice, millet as raw materials, the general alcohol content is 14% - 20%, belongs to low degree brewing wine. Yellow rice wine has high nutrition value, contains 21 kinds of amino acids, eight kinds of essential amino acids that the human can't synthesis must rely on food intake are all exist in yellow rice wine. “Marden red” is the most famous yellow rice wine in Shangyu, this kind of wine buried in the soil when girls born, after about 18 years, as present to husband on the wedding.

Tourist attractions 
Shangyu has a long history, the inscriptions on oracle bones have already recorded “Shangyu” which is 3000 years ago. Therefore, many human landscapes were existed in history and keep until now.
Southern part of Shangyu are hilly and mountain area, natural landscapes like quaternary glacier and fruit trees are famous here.

Fengming Mountain

Fengming mountain is located in the town of Fenghui, about far from town center. Scenic area is about 2.4 square kilometers, the “overhanging rocks and waterfall” and “one-thousand-year-old vine” are most popular and shocked landscapes. In addition, Taoist literatures named here are “the ninth great holy land” because alchemy ancestor and the Taoist patriarch Wei Boyang was born and concocted pills of immortality in this mountain, finally write down the book “Zhou yi shen tong qi”, which has great and unique contribution to the study of ancient chemistry and health science.

Gong Mountain

Gong mountain located in Songxia town, cross Yixian County, Xiuning County and Huizhou District. The area is about 1078 square kilometers. Gong mountain is one of the most famous three mountains in Zhejiang province. Sunrise, strangely-shaped pines, rocks, sea of clouds, hot springs are "five beauties" that all tourists love them. In addition, Gong mountain with important scientific and ecological value of study the change and development of geologic structures.

The Famen Temple

Faning Temple, renowned for storing the veritable finger bone of the Shakyamuni Buddha, is located in Shangyu of Zhejiang province. Faning Temple was established in the Eastern Han Dynasty (25–220) for spreading Buddhism. The most representative structures in the temple are the Faning Temple Pagoda and Faning Temple Museum. Many royal treasures and jewelry were found here because Buddhism was supported by dominators in ancient China. Faning Temple was the royal temple during the Sui and Tang Dynasty. Emperors in Sui and Tang believed that enshrining and worshiping the bone of Shakyamuni would bring richness and peace to the land and people. So, the finger bone was stored carefully, which was housed in the underground palace.

Glaciers of Fuzhi mountain

Fuzhi mountain located in the border area of Shangyu, Shengzhou and Yuyao city. The elevation of Fuzhi mountain is 861.3 meters, cloud and mist around the mountain almost whole year, and a stone river rolling with the slope. The existence of stone river duo to the quaternary glacier movements.

The large scale of the fourth stone glaciers in Shangyu, the richness of the ancient glacial kinds and located in such low latitudes and low altitude area is rare all over the word, which is called the world wonder. Discovery results has proved that in the early Quaternary period of about 2.9 to 3 million 500 thousand years ago, this area did have a large scale of ancient glacial movement. It can provide important practical data for the study of quaternary geological history, climate and environmental evolution in east Asia and the world. On the other hand, because of the unique sceneries of the stone glacier and the ice terrace that high ornamental value in Fuzhi mountain become an awesome tourist resource.

Nautical Flower Fields Of Hangzhou Bay （杭州湾海上花田）

The nautical flower fields of Hangzhou Bay located in the south part of Hangzhou Bay New Area. This tourist attraction is made up of landscapes of blooming flowers, lakes and faux landmarks like a windmill and a chapel. People come here to enjoy pastoral ecological scenery and the experience of agriculture. It's a colorful garden landscape with colorful pastoral and sea flower fields, and has five functional areas, such as colorful pastoral area. This place has developed a leisure tourism sub-project such as the Agronomical Hall, the Ecological Agriculture Demonstration Base, and the Ten-mile Gallery to provide visitors with an idyllic ecological depth experience.

References

Shaoxing
 
Districts of Zhejiang